Faucon may refer to:

French communes 
 Faucon, Vaucluse
 Faucon-de-Barcelonnette, Alpes-de-Haute-Provence
 Faucon-du-Caire, Alpes-de-Haute-Provence
 Aunou-le-Faucon, Orne
 Saint-Julien-le-Faucon, Calvados
 Villers-Faucon, Somme

Other 
 Bernard Faucon (born 1950), French photographer and writer
 Philippe Faucon (born 1958), French film director, screenwriter and producer
 Le Faucon (film), a 1983 film by Tunisian director Paul Boujenah
 Le faucon (opera), a 1786 opera by the Russian composer Dmitry Bortniansky
 French ship Faucon
 Faucon, a French ship which sank off Formentera, Balearic Islands in 1673